The 2022 MK John Wilson Trophy was the fourth event in the 2022–23 ISU Grand Prix of Figure Skating, a senior-level international invitational competition series. It was held at the IceSheffield in Sheffield on November 11–13. It was the replacement event for Cup of China. Medals were awarded in the disciplines of men's singles, women's singles, pairs, and ice dance. Skaters also earned points toward qualifying for the 2022–23  Grand Prix Final.

On July 21, 2022, the International Skating Union announced that the MK John Wilson Trophy would replace Cup of China, which was cancelled on May 10 due to travel restrictions and quarantine requirements related to the COVID-19 pandemic. The last time the event was cancelled, in 2021, Cup of China was replaced by the 2021 Gran Premio d'Italia.

Entries 
The International Skating Union announced the preliminary assignments on July 22, 2022.

Changes to preliminary assignments

Results

Men

Women

Pairs

Ice dance

References

External links 
 MK John Wilson Trophy at the International Skating Union

2022 in figure skating
MK John Wilson Trophy